Gislövs läge och Simremarken was a village situated in Trelleborg Municipality, Skåne County, Sweden with 1,462 inhabitants in 2005.

It has since 2010 grown to be a joint part of the greater development of Trelleborg. There no longer exists an official development unit by this name.

References 

Populated places in Skåne County